The Kaufmann's Department Store Warehouse (also known as the Forbes Stevenson Building, or Forbes Med-Tech Center) located in the Bluff neighborhood of Pittsburgh, Pennsylvania, is a building from 1901. It was listed on the National Register of Historic Places in 1997.

See also
Reymer Brothers Candy Factory at 1425 Forbes Ave.

References

Commercial buildings on the National Register of Historic Places in Pennsylvania
Renaissance Revival architecture in Pennsylvania
Commercial buildings completed in 1901
Commercial buildings in Pittsburgh
Warehouses on the National Register of Historic Places
National Register of Historic Places in Pittsburgh